Menshevizing idealism, also known as menshevistic idealism, is a term that was widely used in Soviet Marxist literature and referred to the errors committed in philosophy by Abram Deborin’s group. The term was coined by Joseph Stalin in 1930. Menshevistic idealism tried to identify Marxist dialectics with Hegel’s, divorced theory from practice, and underestimated the Leninist stage in the development of philosophy.

References

Further reading 
  Коршунов Н. Б. Так называемый «меньшевиствующий идеализм» в аспекте философских дискуссий начала 30-х годов в СССР. Диссертация на соискание учёной степени кандидата философских наук : 09.00.03. — Москва, 2003. — 248 с.

Menshevizing idealism
Russian philosophy